Romain Alessandrini (born 3 April 1989) is a French footballer who plays as a winger for Chinese Super League club Shenzhen.

Club career
Alessandrini spent six years of his youth career at Marseille. In 2005, he moved to Gueugnon making his debut in the third-tier Championnat National in 2008.

In 2010, he signed for Ligue 2 side Clermont Foot, playing two seasons there.

In February 2013, while playing for Rennes, was selected by Didier Deschamps to play for France but an injury which ended his season, prevented him from making his international debut.

In summer 2014, Alessandrini returned to Marseille, joining from Rennes for a reported €5 million transfer fee.

On 31 January 2017, he was signed by LA Galaxy as a Designated Player. In January 2020, Alessandrini announced he would not return for LA Galaxy for 2020 season via Instagram.

On 28 February 2020, Alessandrini signed with Chinese club Qingdao Huanghai.

Style of play
Alessandrini is known for his pace, dribbling, and contributing goals and goal scoring opportunities from midfield.

Career statistics

References

External links
 
 
 
 
 

1989 births
Living people
French footballers
French people of Italian descent
Ligue 1 players
Ligue 2 players
Championnat National players
FC Gueugnon players
Clermont Foot players
Stade Rennais F.C. players
Olympique de Marseille players
LA Galaxy players
Qingdao F.C. players
Shenzhen F.C. players
Footballers from Marseille
Designated Players (MLS)
Major League Soccer players
Chinese Super League players
French expatriate footballers
French expatriate sportspeople in the United States
Expatriate soccer players in the United States
French expatriate sportspeople in China
Expatriate footballers in China
Association football wingers